Liggett Building may refer to:

The Liggett Building (Seattle, Washington), a 1927 building listed on the National Register of Historic Places listings in Seattle
The Liggett Building, a former corporate headquarters building on 42nd Street in Manhattan for Liggett's Drugstores
The Liggett Building, a historic building in Marysville, Ohio